The 1885 Home Nations Championship was the third series of the rugby union Home Nations Championship. It was contested by England, Ireland, Scotland, and Wales, but the tournament was not completed.

The 1885 Championship was notable for the disputes occurring between the Home Nation Unions which prevented a full tournament to be completed. England and Scotland refused to face each other due to the refereeing disagreement from their 1884 encounter, and Wales and Ireland also failed to meet due to union disputes. The 1885 Championship also experienced a rare replay, when the Ireland versus Scotland game at Ormeau was abandoned after bad weather stopped play. The replay was played in Scotland.

Table

Source:

The matches

Wales vs. England

Wales: Arthur Gould (Newport), Frank Hancock (Cardiff), Martyn Jordan (Newport), Charles Taylor (Ruabon), Charlie Newman (Newport) capt., William Gwynn (Swansea), Ernest Rowland (Lampeter), John Sidney Smith (Cardiff), Evan Richards (Swansea), Tom Clapp (Newport), Bob Gould (Newport), Horace Lyne (Newport), Thomas Baker Jones (Newport), Samuel Goldsworthy (Swansea), Lewis Thomas (Cardiff)

England: HB Tristram (Oxford University), CG Wade (Oxford University), Andrew Stoddart (Blackheath), JJ Hawcridge (Bradford), A Rotherham (Oxford University), JH Payne (Broughton), Frank Moss (Broughton), G Harrison (Hull), AT Kemble (Liverpool), RS Kindersley (Oxford University), HJ Ryalls (New Brighton), ED Court (Blackheath), RSF Henderson (Blackheath), A Teggin (Broughton), ET Gurdon (Richmond) capt.

Scotland vs. Wales

Source:

Scotland Pat Harrower, Bill Maclagan capt., Alexander Stephen, Gardy Maitland, Bunny Wauchope, Augustus Grant-Asher, Tom Ainslie, George Robb, John Jamieson, Robert Maitland, William Peterkin, Charlie Reid, Charles Berry, John Tod, Gordon Mitchell

Wales: Arthur Gould, Frank Hancock, Martyn Jordan, Charles Taylor, Charlie Newman capt., William Gwynn, Willie Thomas, Edward Alexander, Frank Hill, Tom Clapp, Bob Gould, D Morgan, Thomas Baker-Jones, Samuel Goldsworthy, Lewis Thomas

England vs. Ireland

England: CH Sample (Cambridge University), WN Bolton (Blackheath), Andrew Stoddart (Blackheath), JJ Hawcridge (Bradford), A Rotherham (Oxford University), JH Payne (Broughton), Frank Moss (Broughton), G Harrison (Hull), AT Kemble (Liverpool), Charles Gurdon (Richmond), HJ Ryalls (New Brighton), CH Horley (Swinton), CS Wooldridge (Blackheath), GT Thomson (Halifax), ET Gurdon (Richmond) capt.

Ireland: GH Wheeler (Queen's College, Belfast), EH Greene (Dublin Uni.), JP Ross (Lansdowne), RG Warren (Lansdowne), RE McLean (NIFC), EC Crawford (Dublin Uni.), THM Hobbs (Dublin Uni.), Thomas Lyle (Dublin Uni.), FW Moore (Wanderers), T Shanahan (Lansdowne), RM Bradshaw (Wanderers), TC Allen (NIFC), HJ Neill (NIFC), RW Hughes (NIFC), WG Rutherford (Lansdowne) capt.

Scotland vs. Ireland
Source:

Scotland James Veitch, Bill Maclagan (capt), Henry Evans, Gardyne Maitland, ARD (Bunny) Wauchope, Patrick Wauchope, Tom Ainslie, John Brown, John Jamieson, Walter Irvine, William Peterkin, Charlie Reid, Jack Tait, John Tod, Gordon Mitchell

Ireland: Robert Morrow, Ernest Greene, John Ross, Robert Warren, Daniel Ross, D.V. Hunter, J.A. Thompson, Thomas Lyle, Frederick Moore, Thomas Shanahan, Robert Bradshaw, Arthur Forrest (capt), Harry Neill, Jack Johnston, William Hogg

References

Further reading
 

1885
1884–85 in British rugby union
1884–85 in English rugby union
rugby union
rugby union
1884–85 in Scottish rugby union